The Denton Record-Chronicle  is the main newspaper for the city of Denton, Texas and Denton County.

In 1899, William Edwards consolidated the Denton Chronicle and Denton County Record (founded 1892 and 1898, respectively) as a weekly newspaper. It began publishing daily August 3, 1903. The estimated daily subscription circulation in 2011 was 9,200, with a Wednesday circulation of 24,700 and a Sunday circulation of 12,500.

In 2018, the longtime publisher of the Chronicle, Bill Patterson, purchased the newspaper from A.H. Belo Corporation, which had bought it from the Patterson family in 1999. Printing and distribution of the newspaper remained with Belo, and a content-sharing agreement continues between the Chronicle and the Belo flagship Dallas Morning News. In 2022, KERA announced its plans to acquire the Record-Chronicle.

The newspaper also prints and distributes a semi-monthly magazine, Denton County magazine.

References

External links

Official site
Official mobile site

Daily newspapers published in Texas
Denton County, Texas
Denton, Texas